Robert Eria Telson (born May 14, 1949) is an American composer, songwriter, and pianist best known for his work in musical theater and film, for which he has received Tony, Pulitzer, and Academy Award nominations.

Biography
Robert Eria Telson was born in Cannes, France, in 1949. He grew up in Brooklyn, New York, son of Paula (née Blackman) and David Telson. He began studying piano when he was five years old. By nine he had already performed a Mozart piece on television and given a concert of his own compositions. At 14, he wrote 72 love songs for his first girlfriend, Margie. At 16 and 17 he studied organ, counterpoint and harmony in France with the teacher Nadia Boulanger. He followed this with a degree in music from Harvard University in 1970. Telson also played organ and composed original songs for a rock band called The Bristols, while he was a high school student at Poly Prep in Brooklyn, New York. Several of these were recorded at Decca Studios but never released. At Harvard, he formed another group called Groundspeed, which brought him back to the Decca Studios in 1967 to record a demo recording of his songs "L-12 East" and "In a Dream" with producer Dick Jacobs. This was released by the label in 1968.  After the demise of Groundspeed, Telson formed the band Revolutionary Music Collective, which included then-unknown singer Bonnie Raitt on lead vocals.

After graduation from Harvard, Telson's first professional work was as a member of the Philip Glass Ensemble from 1972 to 1974. After that began his immersion in ethnic world music, as the pianist of salsa bandleaders Tito Puente and Machito. He was then organist of the gospel group Five Blind Boys of Alabama, for whom he also composed, arranged and produced.  Collaborating with director/writer Lee Breuer, in 1983 he composed the musical The Gospel at Colonus, an adaptation of Sophocles's Oedipus tale, featuring Morgan Freeman, the Five Blind Boys and the Soul Stirrers. Newsweek Magazine called it: "The best white man’s capturings of the essence of black music since Gershwin's Porgy and Bess."

As a composer, Telson received an Academy Award nomination for his song "Calling You" from the movie Bagdad Café, as well as Pulitzer, Grammy and Tony Award nominations for his Broadway musicals, The Gospel at Colonus and Chronicle of a Death Foretold, an adaptation of the Gabriel García Márquez novel.

Telson has composed soundtracks for American, French, German and Argentinian films (including five for Percy Adlon), as well as a ballet score for Twyla Tharp (Sextet) His songs have been recorded by many international artists, such as Barbra Streisand, Natalie Cole, George Benson, Joe Cocker, Celine Dion, Wynton Marsalis, k.d. lang, Shawn Colvin, Caetano Veloso, Gal Costa, Etta James, Jeff Buckley, and George Michael.

According to The New York Times: "Mr. Telson has a remarkable talent for relating to musicians from diverse musical cultures and for writing stirring, dramatic music in non-Western European idioms." They also described his music as "a compendium of world music styles brilliantly reimagined, embellished and sometimes made to overlap by Mr. Telson, a classically trained American composer and multi-instrumentalist".

Current work
Telson's latest CD, entitled Defying the Distances was released in 2019.

Musical theater
 Sister Suzie Cinema – premiere: 1980 NY Public Theater / collaboration with Lee Breuer
 The Gospel at Colonus – 1983 Brooklyn Academy of Music / collaboration with Lee Breuer/ 1988 Broadway, still touring internationally
 The Warrior Ant – 1988 Brooklyn Academy of Music/ collaboration with Lee Breuer
 Chronicle of a Death Foretold – 1995 Broadway/ produced by Lincoln Center
 Bagdad Cafe the Musical: toured in Europe 2004-6/ collaboration with Percy Adlon and Lee Breuer

Discography
 The Gospel at Colonus (original cast recording) (Nonesuch, 1988)
 Bagdad Cafe (soundtrack) (Island Records, 1989)
 Calling You (Warner Bros., 1992)
 An Ant Alone - Songs from the Warrior Ant (Little Village) (Rykodisk, 1991)
 La Vida Segun Muriel (soundtrack) (Polygram, 1997)
 Trip (Isabel de Sebastian & Bob Telson) (Acqua, 2008)
 Old LP (Acqua (2012), Naxos (2012))
 American Dreamers (CD Baby, 2016)
 Defying the Distances (2019)

References

External links
 

1949 births
Living people
American multi-instrumentalists
American musical theatre composers
American film score composers
American classical composers
Songwriters from New York (state)
Broadway composers and lyricists
People from Cannes
Musicians from Brooklyn
Harvard University alumni
Poly Prep alumni
Gramavision Records artists
Nonesuch Records artists
Island Records artists
PolyGram artists
Naxos Records artists